The 2013 WDF World Cup was the 19th edition of the WDF World Cup darts tournament, organised by the World Darts Federation. It was held in St. John's, Newfoundland and Labrador, Canada from October 1 to 5.

Entered teams

27 countries/associations entered a team in the event, which is eleven less than 2011.  Not all teams took part in all events (for example Switzerland did not enter the youth events).

  Australia
  Bahamas
  Barbados
  Bermuda
  Brazil
  Canada
  Denmark
  England
  Finland

  Germany
  Iceland
  Italy
  Japan
  Jersey
  Netherlands
  Northern Ireland
  Norway
  Republic of Ireland

  Scotland
  South Africa
  Sweden
  Switzerland
  Trinidad & Tobago
  Turks & Caicos Islands
  Turkey
  United States
  Wales

 Guyana and  Uganda originally entered but both pulled out with visa issues

Men's singles

Women's singles

Men's team

Men's Pairs

Women's Pairs

Quarter Finals onwards. Full draw - https://web.archive.org/web/20131008062922/http://dartswdf.com/WC2013/WDFWorldCup2013WomensPairsRoundRobin.pdf

Youth Winners

Final Points Tables

Men

Women

Youth

References

External links
 WDF site for 2013 World Cup

WDF World Cup darts
WDF World Cup